Woluwe-Saint-Pierre or Sint-Pieters-Woluwe is one of the 19 municipalities of the Brussels-Capital Region, Belgium. Located in the eastern part of the region, it is bordered by Etterbeek, Auderghem and Woluwe-Saint-Lambert, as well as the Flemish municipalities of Kraainem and Tervuren. In common with all of Brussels' municipalities, it is legally bilingual (French–Dutch).

, the municipality had a population of 42,216 inhabitants. It is mostly a well-to-do residential area, which includes the wide, park-lined, Avenue de Tervueren/Tervurenlaan, and the numerous embassies located near Marshal Montgomery Square. Of the three streams that once crossed the municipality, only the Woluwe, a tributary of the Senne, can still largely be seen today.

History

Middle Ages to 17th century
The first appearance of the name Wolewe dates from 1117 and can be found in a charter from Forest. At that time, the original hamlet and its farms were dependencies of the Park Abbey near Leuven. The onset of difficulties can be traced to the middle of the 16th century, with the hostilities waged by Philip II of Spain against the heretical Protestants and the ensuing poverty and famine took their toll on the entire population. Safety and prosperity returned under the reigns of Archdukes Albert VII and Isabella at the beginning of the 17th century. The first grand alley linking Tervuren to Brussels, then known as the "Street of the Duke", dates from that period.

18th century until today
The French Revolution was also a troubled period for Woluwe-Saint-Pierre. The roads became insecure, the religious freedoms were drastically curtailed, much of the local wild life was exterminated for food, and the lack of coal and wood forced people to use peat for heating. The local administration gained its independence from Brussels, obtained its first mayor on 26 May and its first municipal council in 1819. The commercial opportunities that opened up to the new municipality marked the start of a new era of wealth. The municipality did not expand very quickly, however, until the last two decades of the 19th century. New roads, such as the Avenue de Tervueren/Tervurenlaan, a new train track, imposing mansions, such as the Stoclet Palace, and Woluwe Park, were all built or designed between 1880 and 1910. An important race track, now demolished, was built in 1906. The residential areas came into being right after the First World War and further urbanisation took place after the Second World War. Nowadays, agriculture and fisheries, common before 1918, have completely disappeared. The area now depends nearly exclusively on the service sector of the economy.

Sights
 The extensive Woluwe Park includes giant sequoias, cypresses, and a variety of birds such as mute swans, gulls, and grey herons.
 The imposing modern Municipal Hall is open to visitors.
 The municipality's main church (Saint Peter) was erected in 1755 on the site of a much older building and perpendicular to it, with funds from Forest Abbey. Traces of the older building can still be seen on the left of the current church.
 Several turn-of-the-century houses and manors can still be seen today, such as the Stoclet Palace, which was built between 1905 and 1909 on a design by the Austrian architect Josef Hoffmann for the Belgian financier Adolphe Stoclet, and contains mosaics and paintings by Gustav Klimt.
 The Bibliotheca Wittockiana houses one of the most prestigious bookbinding collections in the world.
 The memorial on the / to the Belgian Volunteer Corps for Korea, the force sent by Belgium to aid South Korea during the Korean War (1950–1953).
 The Brussels Tram Museum displays a collection of trams and buses of different ages.

Famous inhabitants
 Jean Bingen (1920–2012), papyrologist and epigrapher died there
 Henri d'Orléans, Count of Paris (1933–2019), pretender to the French throne
 Eddy Merckx (not currently residing), professional cyclist, multiple winner of the Tour de France and Giro d'Italia in the 1960s and 1970s

International relations

Twin towns and sister cities
Woluwe-Saint-Pierre is twinned with:
  Ruyumba, Rwanda
  Gangnam-gu (Seoul), South Korea
  New Iberia, Louisiana, USA
  Pecica, Romania
  Chaoyang, China
  Chennai, India

See also
 Woluwe stream
 Woluwe-Saint-Lambert (Sint-Lambrechts-Woluwe), an adjacent municipality
 Sint-Stevens-Woluwe

Footnotes

References

Sources

Bibliography
 
 Culot, P. (1996). Bibliotheca Wittockiana. Brussels:Crédit communal, .

External links

 Official site of the municipality, in French, Dutch, and English
 Official website of the Bibliotheca Wittockiana

 
Municipalities of the Brussels-Capital Region
Populated places in Belgium